Tancua is a village in the department of Jura in the region of Bourgogne-Franche-Comté, France. Formerly a separate municipality, it was merged with Morbier on 1 January 2007. Its inhabitants are known as Quewans.

Tancua was, until well into the 20th century, mainly agricultural, especially for livestock breeding and dairy farming, with somewhat of a logging industry.

Demographics

References

Former communes of Jura (department)